() or kimchi stew is a , or stew-like Korean dish, made with kimchi and other ingredients, such as pork or seafood, scallions, onions, and diced tofu. It is one of the most common stews in Korean cuisine.

History
Kimchi existed as a non-spicy pickled vegetable dish well prior to the Joseon era (1392–1897); it was not until the introduction of chili peppers to the Korean peninsula mid-era that the variant of kimchi which has become the de facto standard of today was created.  is assumed to have developed around this time as well.

Preparation and serving
Kimchi's flavor as an ingredient becomes stronger and more complex as it ages. As a result,  is often cooked using older, more fermented, and "riper" kimchi, which has a much more pronounced flavor and contains higher amounts of probiotics. (Living bacteria in fresh, uncooked kimchi will not survive the cooking process.)

Sliced kimchi is put into a pot with the meat of choice and other typical ingredients, such as tofu, sliced spring onions, and garlic. They are stewed in water or anchovy stock. The stew is seasoned with fermented bean paste or fermented red pepper paste.

Like many other Korean dishes,  is usually eaten communally from the center of the table if more than two people are served. It is accompanied by traditional side dishes and rice.  It is usually cooked and served boiling hot in a stone pot.

Varieties

Beyond the standard ingredients of beef, pork, or chicken, some varieties are called by their particular names.
It is popular for camping trips or picnics, because of its ease of cooking and portability.
 is made with Pacific saury.
 is made by stewing kimchi with various ingredients not native to Korean cuisine, including Spam, hot dogs, and American cheese slices.  means "army base" in Korean; it originated during the Korean War, when South Koreans used ingredients procured from the US military.

See also
 List of stews

References

External links

Kimchi Jjigae (Stew) – Recipe at the official Seoul City tourism website (archived)

Korean words and phrases
Korean soups and stews